Maaficha Sakshidar (Marathi: माफीचा साक्षीदार) (English : Witness to the prosecution) is a 1986 Marathi film directed by Raj Dutt, starring  Nana Patekar, Mohan Gokhale, Avinash Kharshikar and Usha Naik. The film is based on the infamous Joshi-Abhyankar serial murders which took place in Pune during 1976-77.

Plot
Based on a true story (the infamous Joshi-Abhyankar serial murders which took place in Pune in 1976-77), this movie deals with the execution of four commercial art students after they were convicted of ten murders.
Later on, on this incident, Anurag Kashyap made his film Paanch.

Cast

Nana Patekar as Raghavendra "Raghava"
Mohan Gokhale as Sunil "Sunya"
Bipin Varti as Rakesh "Rocky"
Kishore Jadhav as Manohar
Avinash Kharshikar as Vilas Modak
Usha Naik as Geeta, Sunil's girlfriend
Jayram Kulkarni as College Professor
Arun Sarnaik as Lawyer (Public Prosecutor)
Kamlakar Sarang as Defence Lawyer
Datta Bhat as Judge
Ravi Patwardhan as Police Inspector Jadhav
Ashalata Wabgaonkar as Sunil's mother
Sumati Gupte as Raghavendra Mother
Bindu as Dancer in Restaurant/Bar (Guest Appearance)
Padma Khanna in a guest appearance in the song "Shama Ne Jab Aag"
 Irshad Hashmi as Commissioner
 Vasant Shinde as police constable

Music
Music composed by Vishwanath More.
 "Jeevan Mein Aayi Nasha"
 "Rangale Nave Nave Swapna"

References

External links
 

Indian drama films
Indian films based on actual events
1980s Marathi-language films